The Greenlandic local elections of 2017 were held on 4 April 2017 for Greenland's 3 regional municipality councils, 2 transition committees, several settlement councils and parochial church councils. All seats will be contested for the 2018–21 term of office. In the previous election there were 70 seats.

Results

Results of municipal elections

Number of councillors and political parties in the regional Municipal Councils

Mayors in the regional municipalities
The mayors (Greenlandic: Kommuneqarfiup Siulersortaa; plural: Kommuneqarfiup Siulersortai, Danish: Borgmester; plural: Borgmestre) of the 5 municipalities heads the council meetings and is the chairman of the finance committee in each of their respective municipalities.

Old and new mayors in the regional municipalities
The term of office for the mayors elected by the majority of councillors among its members in each municipal council is the same as for the councils elected, namely 2 April 2013 until 31 April 2017.

References

External links
"Local Elections 17" on the Greenlandic English-speaking website The Arctic Journal
 Election results by Municipality

2017
2017 elections in North America
2017 elections in Europe
Elections
April 2017 events in North America